"You Were Right" is the first single released from English singer-songwriter Badly Drawn Boy's second studio album, Have You Fed the Fish? He recorded the song and album following his work on the soundtrack to the 2002 romantic comedy-drama film About a Boy. The song, written through the process of arranging random words into fluent verses, contains references to several musicians, including Madonna, Frank Sinatra, Jeff Buckley, Kurt Cobain, and John Lennon, as well as Elizabeth II.

"You Were Right" was released in the United Kingdom on 14 October 2002, debuting and peaking at number nine on the UK Singles Chart but staying in the top 100 for only three weeks. It remains Badly Drawn Boy's highest-charting single and sole top-10 hit in the UK. On the Eurochart Hot 100, the track charted for one week at number 45. The music video for the song was directed by Simon Henwood.

Background
Badly Drawn Boy first wrote the song when he thought of the phrase 'the night Sinatra died'. He created the melody of the song and presented it to his parents, who responded with indifference, but the singer believed that the song possessed something. After composing the opening line, 'And you were right to bide your time / And not buy into my misery', he then sang random words into a Dictaphone and analysed the results. Once he had arranged the phrases into a pleasing outcome, he met with producer Tom Rothrock and drummer Joey Waronker to set the composition to music. It was recorded at three studios: Cello Studios in Los Angeles, California; the Embassy in Basingstoke, England; and Olympic Studios in London, England.

Lyrical content
Badly Drawn Boy composed the lyric to "You Were Right" by arranging random words into a song that both made sense and reflected upon his life. It eventually resulted in the tribute verse that mentions the deaths of several of Badly Drawn Boy's idols—Kurt Cobain, Jeff Buckley, and John Lennon. He then came up with the line about Madonna, 'I'm turning Madonna down / Calling it my best move', then began to piece the indiscriminate lines together until he achieved the message he wanted the song to send. According to Badly Drawn Boy, the song is about 'not wasting the chance with real life just because you got this opportunity to be a pop star,' and it serves as a 'reminder of what's important and not to lose your marbles'.

Critical reception
AllMusic critic Tom Maginnis wrote that "You Were Right" is an 'ambitiously orchestrated bit of pop music that is equal parts confessional and affirmation', and that Badly Drawn Boy 'manage[d] to pull it all together in a bittersweet, tumultuous swirl, built around a halting mid-tempo beat that combines layers of guitars and strings to which Gough sings with a matter of fact directness that gives emotional weight to his almost free associative soul baring ... All tolled, "You Were Right" reveals a deeply thoughtful songwriter, interweaving mature themes into compelling music that challenges both himself and his listeners'.

Track listings
UK CD single
 "You Were Right" – 4:49
 "Last Fruit" – 4:20
 "You Were Right" (live at Glastonbury 2002) – 5:34

UK 7-inch single
A. "You Were Right"
B. "Last Fruit"

Credits and personnel
Credits are taken from the UK CD single liner notes.

Studios
 Recorded at Cello Studios (Los Angeles, California), the Embassy (Basingstoke, England), and Olympic Studios (London, England)

Personnel

 Badly Drawn Boy – writing, vocals, guitars, piano, synthesizer, production
 John "Gumby" Goodwin – steel guitar
 Sasha Krivtsov – bass
 Joey Waronker – drums
 Matt Dunkley – string arrangement and conductor
 Tom Rothrock – production, mixing
 John Paterno – engineering

 Dan Porter – assistant engineering
 Darren Mora – assistant engineering
 Mike Tarantino – digital editing, additional engineering
 Andy Votel – artwork
 Jazz Summers – management
 Tim Parry – management

Charts

Release history

References

2002 singles
2002 songs
Badly Drawn Boy songs
Cultural depictions of Elizabeth II
Cultural depictions of Frank Sinatra
Cultural depictions of John Lennon
Cultural depictions of Kurt Cobain
Cultural depictions of Madonna
Song recordings produced by Tom Rothrock
Songs about musicians
UK Independent Singles Chart number-one singles
XL Recordings singles